15-Crown-5 is a crown ether with the formula (C2H4O)5.  It is a cyclic pentamer of ethylene oxide that forms complex with various cations, including sodium (Na+) and potassium (K+), however, it is complementary to Na+ and thus has a higher selectivity for Na+ ions.

Synthesis 
15-Crown-5 can be synthesized using a modified Williamson ether synthesis:

(CH2OCH2CH2Cl)2 + O(CH2CH2OH)2 + 2 NaOH → (CH2CH2O)5 + 2 NaCl + 2 H2O

It also forms from the cyclic oligomerization of ethylene oxide in the presence of gaseous boron trifluoride.

Properties
Analogous to 18-crown-6, 15-crown-5 binds to sodium ions.  Thus, when treated with this complexing agent, sodium salts often become soluble in organic solvents.

First-row transition metal dications fit snugly inside the cavity of 15-crown-5.  They are too small to be included in 18-crown-6. The binding of transition metal cations results in multiple hydrogen-bonded interactions from both equatorial and axial aqua ligands, such that highly crystalline solid-state supramolecular polymers can be isolated. Metal salts isolated in this form include Co(ClO4)2, Ni(ClO4)2, Cu(ClO4)2, and Zn(ClO4)2. Seven coordinate species are most common for transition metal ions complexes of 15-crown-5, with the crown ether occupying the equatorial plane, along with 2 axial aqua ligands.

15-crown-5 has also been used to isolate salts of oxonium ions. For example, from a solution of tetrachloroauric acid, the oxonium ion  has been isolated as the salt . Neutron diffraction studies revealed a sandwich structure, which shows a chain of water with remarkably long O-H bond (1.12 Å) in the acidic proton, but with a very short OH•••O distance (1.32 Å).

A derivative of 15-crown-5, benzo-15-crown-5, has been used to produce anionic complexes of carbido ligands as their  salts:

See also
 Host guest chemistry
 Phase transfer catalyst

References

Further reading

External links
 ChemicalLand21.com
 www.ChemBlink.com

Crown ethers